John Charles Huddleston (born April 10, 1954) is a former American football linebacker in the National Football League (NFL) who played for the Oakland Raiders. He played college football at the University of Utah.

References 

1954 births
Living people
Players of American football from Los Angeles
American football linebackers
Utah Utes football players
Oakland Raiders players